Pershing County School District provides public education for all grades in Pershing County, Nevada. The headquarters of the district are in Lovelock, the county seat. The school district has only four schools.

PCSD Schools
 Imlay Elementary
 Lovelock Elementary
 Pershing County High School
 Pershing County Middle School

References

School districts in Nevada
Pershing County, Nevada